The Ministry of Foreign Trade and Tourism of Peru or MINCETUR is the ministry in charge of issues pertaining to foreign trade of the Government of Peru and the promotion of Tourism in Peru. , the minister of foreign trade and tourism is Luis Fernando Helguero.

Objectives
The Ministry of Foreign Trade and Tourism defines, directs, executes, coordinates, and supervises the policies of foreign trade and tourism. It has responsibility in issues pertaining to exportation and international business agreements, which is manages in coordination with the Ministry of Foreign Relations, and the Ministry of the Economy and Finances as well as other sectors of the Peruvian government within their respective jurisdictions.

Additionally it is in charge of regulating foreign trade. The ministry directs international trade negotiations for the Peruvian government and is empowered to sign agreements within its jurisdiction. In the Tourism sector, it promotes, orients, and regulates tourist activity with the goal of promoting sustainable development for tourism, and it includes the promotion, orientation, and regulation of arts and crafts directed towards tourists.

Accomplishments
It promotes free trade agreements, as well as manages the tourism entity PromPeru, a government organization responsible for promoting Tourism to Peru around the world. The ministry has signed the following treaties:

Canada-Peru Free Trade Agreement
Chile-Peru Free Trade Agreement
Thailand-Peru Free Trade Agreement
United States-Peru Trade Promotion Agreement

External links
 Official Website 

Foreign Trade
Peru